The Marine Corps of the Republic of Indonesia  (KORMAR RI), previously known as the Commando Corps of the Indonesian Navy (KKO), is an integral part of the Indonesian Navy and is sized at the military corps level unit as the naval infantry and main amphibious warfare force of Indonesia. The Marine Corps is commanded by a two-star Marine Major General. 

The Marine Corps was initially formed as a special operations force for the Indonesian Navy (TNI-AL), then named  abbreviated "KKO". The Marine Corps was actively involved in various confrontations and conflicts in Indonesia.

History

The date was later commemorated as the birthday of the Marine Corps. The CM was originally intended to serve as 'training school' for Navy sailors to be able to fight in ground warfare in case of emergency. Most of its pioneer instructors were graduates of the sailing school. However, at least one of its instructors, Tatang Rusmaja, a former PETA member, actually had experience in ground warfare. Due to a lack of naval equipment or ships, the CM was forced to join guerrilla warfare in the jungles and mountains of Central Java. Marines were deployed several times along with the Army to fight the Royal Netherlands East Indies Army and during this time, the commander of armed forces assigned the CM, which had combat experience as a  ground unit, away from the Navy and transformed into a regiment within Diponegoro Division of Indonesian Army on 17 March 1948.

On 9 October 1948, the Ministry of Defense acknowledged the need for an amphibious commando unit and issued Minister Decree No. A/565/1948 regarding the establishment of a naval infantry corps within the Navy named  (KKO) or Naval Commando Corps. The first recruitment batch of this new commando unit arrived in 1949 and almost all of the first recruits were veterans of the CM in Tegal. Later on, the huge number of CM veterans in active duty within this formation would later justify the date of the Marine Corps Birthday, being set and held annually every 15 November in memory of its foundation. In 1950 the armored element was raised, the basis of the 1st Marine Cavalry Regiment, armed at first with equipment left behind by the Dutch.

The KKO was active in various military operations in Indonesia. One of the largest amphibious military operations would have been Operation Jayawijaya in which thousands of marines were planned to land on Biak in 1963 as a part of the Trikora Campaign to take West Irian from Dutch control. The operation was aborted as a consequence of deals preceding the New York Agreement. That campaign saw massive rearmament of the Corps as per the national policies of guided democracy in the later years of the Sukarno presidency, part of the increasing military ties between Indonesia and the Warsaw Pact, wherein the former US-made equipment would be replaced by Russian-produced APCs and IFVs including the PT-76 Amphibious light tanks, BTR-50 APCs and BM-14/17 MRLs (Southeast Asia's first-ever MRL system in service).

At the height of the Indonesia-Malaysia Confrontation, Harun Hj Mohd Said and Usman Ali (hereinafter known as Usman Harun), two members of the KKO were dispatched to Singapore ( then a part of Malaysia ) using rubber boats. Their main task was to infiltrate and sabotage the interests of Malaysia and Singapore. In reality, this operation was only able to blow up the MacDonald House and cause civilian and non-military casualties. In that incident, 20 fruit shops around the hotel were heavily damaged, 24 sedan vehicles were destroyed, 30 people died, and 35 people suffered mild and serious injuries. This incident is known as the MacDonald House bombing. Usman Harun was unable to escape from Singapore and was eventually arrested and sentenced to death by the Singaporean government.

On 15 November 1975 (the Corps' 30th anniversary), Chief of Staff of the Navy issued a decree Skept/1831/XI/1975, which restored the Corps' name to its former name . (Corps Mariniers/ CM is the same word but using old spelling system in Indonesian.) Following this, a massive reorganization plan was implemented, followed up with another in 1984.

There was a plan in 1999 to expand the Marine Corps from its strength of 13,000 troops. Based on this plan, every Marine Base would have three combat brigades: the Infantry, Cavalry, and Artillery and would be supported by one Combat Support Regiment and one Administration Support Regiment. The expansion would create three Kormar bases: Surabaya for Eastern area command, Jakarta for Central area command, and Rate Island in Lampung for Western area command.

The 1st Marine Brigade and all combat support and service support elements were consolidated in 2001 to form the 1st Marine Forces East (Pasmar 1). In 2004, the 2nd Marine Forces West (Pasmar 2) was established on the basis of the Marine Independent Brigade, now including the 2nd and 3rd Marine Brigades plus additional combat support and service support units. All these were a result of a massive modernization and expansion program that still continues today. A 3rd division-sized unit would be raised in 2018 as part of the expansion.

Following a reorganisation introduced in March 2001, the corps consisted of the 1st Marine Corps Group (1,3,5 Battalions, 1st combat support regiment, and 1st administrative support regiment) at Surabaya and the Independent Marine Corps Brigade (2,4,6, battalions) at Jakarta (JDW 11 April 2001). The 8th Bn was formed in January 2004 and the 9th Bn was due to be formed in April 2004. They were planned to be part of a new group that would include the 7th Bn and support elements. (JDW 18 February 2004, p. 18) The same Jane's Defence Weekly story (Robert Karniol, 'Indonesia Reinforces Marines') said the Marine Corps leadership is reported to have ambitions for the service to expand to at least two full divisions. However, it was reported that the army was opposed, 'perhaps reflecting its leadership's concern over influence.'

History of the beret color and Corps emblem (Gold Anchor and Black Kris)

In 1958, the color purple was used by the Marine Corps (when it was still called KKO-AL) in the form of a ribbon as security code to hold landing operations in Padang, West Sumatera during Operation 17 August (as a response to the PPRI/Permesta revolt by several Army officers). The purple beret was the first time used by the 1st Battalion KKO AL (1st Marine Battalion) in Operation Alugoro in Aceh in August 1961. Furthermore, the beret was equipped with emblems. Initially, the Marine Corps emblem was a red pentagon with the symbol of a golden tricorn hat and two crossed swords in the middle, the beret was pushed to the left where the emblem was located. In 1962, coinciding with the 17th anniversary of KKO-AL (old name of Indonesian Marines), there was a change in the emblem with the introduction of the Keris Samudera sword emblem surrounded by a ribbon with the words "Jalesu Bhumyamca Jayamahe" and there is a writing bearing "Commando Corps" underneath. In between the Corps and Commando writings, there was a printed 1945 number indicating the Marine Corps year of foundation and below the traditional sword, blue wavy lines reflecting the wide Indonesian seas. The emblem was rectangular. In 1968, another change was made to print "Yellow" strips on the outer rings of the rectangular emblem. In 1975, with the issuance of Naval chief of staff order No. / 1831 / XI / 1975 dated 14 November 1975, the name of the Naval Operations Commando Corps (KKO-AL) changed its name to the Marine Corps in accordance with the name of the Corps Mariniers since 1945, and the waves were thus replaced by a blue lotus, its petals symbolizing amphibious operations and with a silhouette map of Indonesia in black at the center, the emblem now being circular and the gold "Commando Corps" ribbon with the lettering in black changed to that of "Marine Corps". In 1976, the Chief of Staff of the Navy issued Decree No. Skep / 2084 / X / 1976 dated 20 October 1976, on the Change of the Marine Corps Emblem to comply with the earlier decree on the return to the former name of the corps. The change was to add the Anchor as the background of the emblem (to signify the Corps as a constituent service of the Indonesian Navy), the "Marine Corps" ribbon was partially modified and the number "1945" remained at the center as before. The emblem is mounted on a beret provided that the center of the emblem base is located just above the outer end of the left eye's forehead, and thus is pushed to the right. So the official Corps emblem officially began to be used exactly on the 31st Marine Corps Birthday Parade in Jakarta on 15 November 1976 when new colours were awarded to the Corps.

The Naval Commando Corps (KKO-AL) Emblem was used in 1960–1962, Based on the KKO-AL Commandant's order dated 4 January 1961 Skept Number: 02/KP/KKO/1961.
The Naval Commando Corps (KKO-AL) Emblem was used in 1962–1976, Based on the Commander-in-Chief's command dated 10 September 1962 Skept Number: 5030.6.
The Marine Corps Emblem was Used in 1976–Present, Based on Chief of Staff of the Navy order dated 20 October 1976 Skept Number: Skep/2084/X/ 1976

Symbolism of the Gold Anchor and Black Kris 
 Black Saber Kris Samudera (Saber of the Ocean) - honors the naval heritage of the early Hindu and Buddhist kingdoms, the Christian Kingdom of Larantuka and later Islamic sultanates that form part of modern-day Indonesia
 Relief map on the blue Lotus - The relief map of Indonesia on the blue lotus flower symbolizes the national responsibility of the Corps in the defense of Indonesia through amphibious sea and ground combat operations
 Gold Anchor with Black Chain - acknowledges the naval tradition of the Marines and their continual service as a specialty branch and service within the Indonesian Navy
 Marine Corps Motto "Jalesu Bhumyamca Jayamahe" (Glorious On The Land And Sea) - The Sanskrit motto of the Corps reflects its duty to help the nation win victories in amphibious and conventional ground, air and sea operations, the gold scrolls which hold the motto also remember the cultural heritage of the country it defends

Organization

The order of battle of the Indonesian Marine Corps consists of three divisions, one independent brigade, and a special ops unit (Taifib). Each Marine division oversees the Marine Infantry Brigade, the Marine Combat Support Regiment, the Marine Artillery Regiment and the Marine Cavalry Regiment. The 4th Marine Infantry Brigade covers 4 Marine Infantry Battalions plus other support units. The Marine Corps also maintain a special operations unit which are the Marine's Amphibious Reconnaissance Battalion (Taifib) and also the joint Navy-Marine's counter-terrorism Denjaka.

Organizational Command Structure

As a component Principal Command of the Indonesian Navy, the Marine Corps is structured into the following in accordance with the provisions of Presidential Regulation No. 66/2019 on the Organization of the Indonesian National Armed Forces:

Leadership elements 

 Commandant of the Marine Corps; and
 Deputy Commandant of the Marine Corps.

Leadership support elements 

 Inspectorate of the Marine Corps, headed by a Marine Corps Inspector and oversees three subdivisions:
 Marine Corps General Inspectorate;
 Marine Corps Operations and Training Inspectorate; and
 Marine Corps Treasury Inspectorate.
 Advisors to the Marine Corps Commander:
 Advisors Coordinator;
 Advisor "A" on Operation;
 Advisor "B" on Training;
 Advisor "C" on Management;
 Advisor "D" on Information and Military Technology;
 Advisor "E" on Military Cooperation; and
 Advisor "F" on Social Communication and Maritime Potential.
 Marine Corps Planning and Budgeting Staff;
 Marine Corps Intelligence Staff;
 Marine Corps Operations Staff;
 Marine Corps Personnel Staff;
 Marine Corps Logistics Staff;
 Marine Corps Maritime Potential Staff; and
 Marine Corps Communications and Electronics Staff.

Headquarters service elements 

 Marine Corps Administration Coordinator;
 Marine Corps General Secretariat;
 Marine Corps Center for Command and Control;
 Marine Corps Headquarters Accounting Office; and
 Marine Corps Headquarters Detachment.

Central Executive Agencies 

 Marine Corps Information and Data Processing Service;
 Marine Corps Public Relations Service;
 Marine Corps Administration and Personnel Service;
 Marine Corps Legal Service;
 Marine Corps Health Service;
 Marine Corps Provost Service;
 Marine Corps Materiel Service;
 Marine Corps Ordnance Maintenance Service;
 Marine Corps Communications and Electronic Warfare; and
 Marine Corps Regional Finance Office.

Main Operational Commands 

 1st Marine Force;
 2nd Marine Force; and
 3rd Marine Force.

Operational Commands 

 4th Marine Infantry Brigade;
 Marine Corps Special Force Jala Mangkara Detachment;
 Marine Corps Training Command;
 Marine Corps Base Jakarta;
 Marine Corps Base Surabaya;
 Marine Corps Base Sorong; dan
 Marine Corps Central Hospital Cilandak.

Operational commands

Marine Forces 

The Marine Forces (abbreviated as Pasmar) is the Marine Corps' main operational command. Pasmar's main operational missions are to foster the strength and capability of operational readiness as the Navy's amphibious force in the framework of power projection to the land by sea, coastal defense operations on strategic islands, and other combat operations in accordance with the policy of the Navy Chief of Staff, Marine Corps Commandant, and Commander of the Indonesian National Armed Forces.

The 4th Brigade reports directly to the commander of the 1st Marine Force. In addition the Fleet Marine Force, while under the Indonesian Fleet Command, is operationally responsible to the commanders of the Marine Forces.

Each of the 3 Marine Corps Bases (Jakarta, Surabaya and Sorong) are part of the Marine Force ORBAT.

Taifib

The Batalion Intai Amfibi or Taifib in short is the Marine Corps' amphibious reconnaissance special forces, as it is also capable in special reconnaissance and also in airborne (Para-Commando) missions. They were officially formed on 18 March 1961 as marine commandos and was first deployed in Irian Jaya (Papua) during Operation Trikora in April 1962. Starting from November 1971 it was called as Batalyon Intai Amphibi/Yon Taifib or Amphibious Recon Battalion. In order for a regular marine personnel to become a Taifib personnel, a candidate is selected from the Marine Corps who has already fulfilled the thorough mental and physical requirements, and at least has served in the Marine Corps for two years. The certification of amphibious reconnaissance is notoriously difficult that the passing rate of these candidates in each class is only ten percent. The Taifib today is organized into three battalions, each battalion assigned to each Marine Force of the Corps.

Denjaka

The Detasemen Jala Mangkara or Denjaka in short is the special operations and counter-terrorism forces of the Indonesian Navy. This is a combined detachment formed from selected personnel of the Navy's Frogmen unit (Kopaska) and the Marine Corps' Taifib. According to the directory of the Navy Chief of Staff, Denjaka is a Marine Corps task force under the Indonesian Navy, with the Commandant of the Marine Corps holding responsibilities for general training, while specific training falls under the responsibilities of the Armed Forces' Strategic Intelligence Agency. Meanwhile, operational command of the Denjaka falls directly under the Commander of the National Armed Forces.

Marine Corps Training Command
The Marine Corps Training Command oversees the following training centers:
Marine Special Forces Training Center based in Grati, Pasuruan Regency;
Marine Amphibious Forces Training Center trains Marine personnel in amphibious operations, shooting coordination exercises, personnel embarkation and de-embarkation exercises, and other miscellaneous courses. The center is located in Gunung Sari, Surabaya;
Eight Marine Combat Training Centers which consists of following training centers:
3rd Marine Combat Training Center Grati (Pasuruan Regency);
4th Marine Combat Training Center Purboyo (Malang Regency);
5th Marine Combat Training Center Baluran (Situbondo Regency);
6th Marine Combat Training Center Antralina (Sukabumi Regency);
7th Marine Combat Training Center Lampon (Banyuwangi Regency);
8th Marine Combat Training Center Teluk Ratai (Pesawaran Regency)
9th Marine Combat Training Center Dabo Singkep (Lingga Regency)
Damar Island Marine Combat Training Center (Thousand Islands Regency)
Marine Amphibious Landing and Combat Readiness Training Center; and
Marine Specialized Office Training Center, in charge of preparing specialized qualification courses for Marine personnel.

Insignias and Badges

Note: Indonesia is not a member of NATO, so there is not an official equivalence between the Indonesian military ranks and those defined by NATO. The displayed parallel is approximate and for illustration purposes only.

In the Marine Corps, as part of the Indonesian Navy, the rank structure consists of officers known as in Indonesian as "Perwira", NCOs ("Bintara") and enlisted personnel ("Tamtama".) While the Marine Corps wears the blue shoulder boards (for officers and WOs) and blue stripes (for enlisted personnel) or blue/gold chevrons (for NCOs) as a component service of the Navy its ranks follow those of the Indonesian Army, with the exception of a five-star rank.

The highest rank obtainable in the Marine Corps is Major General, as it is the rank of Commandant of the Marine Corps. However, it is possible to be promoted into higher rank if appointed into a position that requires 3-star rank or higher. Only few people managed to obtain rank of Lieutenant General, one of the most notable persons is Lt Gen (KKO) Ali Sadikin. Also there is Lt Gen R. Hartono, which prominently acts as Vice Chief of Staff of the Navy. And as of present no Marine Corps officer has ever been promoted to General (as 4-star rank in the Navy, only held by Chief of Staff of the Navy).

Officers rank insignia

NCOs and enlisted

Other patches

Honorary Wearers of the Magenta Beret 

As of March 2018, 37 have been given the extraordinary privilege of the Commandant, Indonesian Marine Corps to become Honorary Marines (Warga Kehormatan Kormar TNI-AL) which include the wearing of the Marine Corps combat dress uniform and the magenta beret with the Corps Emblem.

List of Commandants

The Commandant of the Marine Corps is a position that is filled by either a two star general officer of the Marine Corps by appointment of the Chief of Staff of the Navy.

Heavy equipment

Light Weaponry

 SS1-R5 Raider
 SS1-M1
 Pindad SS2
 Denel NTW-20
 Pindad SPR
 FN Minimi
 Pindad SM2
 Vz. 58
 AK-47
 AK-101
 M4
 MP5
 RPG-7
 9K115-2 Metis-M
 MILAN
 PM3

See also
Marines
Amphibious warfare

Indonesian Naval Special Forces
Kopaska
Denjaka

References

External links
 Indonesian Marine Corps official website 
 Indonesian Marine Corps parade

Marines
Indonesian Navy
Military units and formations established in 1945
Military of Indonesia